Mugai Nyodai (1223–1298), was one of the first Zen abbesses and the first female Zen master in Japan. A disciple of Mugaku Sogen, she organized convents and spread the lessons of Rinzai Zen. The only surviving written accounts of her life date to more recent centuries, and so many details of her biography are unclear.

References

Further reading 
Tisdale, Sallie. Women of the Way: Discovering 2,500 Years of Buddhist Wisdom, HarperOne, 2006. 

1223 births
1298 deaths
Adachi clan
Japanese Buddhist nuns
13th-century Buddhist nuns